David Stern (29 March 1910 – 13 February 2003) was an Israeli businessman and politician who served as a member of the Knesset for Likud between 1979 and 1981.

Biography
Stern was born in Suwałki in the Russian Empire (today in Poland) in 1910. During World War I his mother fled the Germans with him and his brother, Avraham, and found refuge with her sister in Russia. Stern studied engineering in Brno in Czechoslovakia. He made aliyah to Mandatory Palestine in 1935, and became a member of Lehi, of which Avraham was the leader. He worked as a building contractor, and was president of the Building Contractors Association.

A member of the Herut central committee, he became a member of Tel Aviv city council in 1969. He was forty-fourth on the Likud list (an alliance of Herut and other right-wing parties) for the 1977 elections, and although Likud only won 43 seats, he entered the Knesset on 18 June 1979 as a replacement for Shmuel Rechtman, who had resigned after failing in an appeal against a conviction for bribery. Placed fifty-fourth on the Likud list for the 1981 elections, Likud won 48 seats and Stern lost his seat in the Knesset.

He died in 2003 at the age of 92.

References

External links

1910 births
2003 deaths
People from Suwałki
People from Suwałki Governorate
Soviet emigrants to Mandatory Palestine
Jews in Mandatory Palestine
Israeli people of Polish-Jewish descent
Lehi (militant group)
Herut politicians
Likud politicians
Members of the 9th Knesset (1977–1981)
20th-century Israeli businesspeople
Burials at Nahalat Yitzhak Cemetery